I'm Gone may refer to:
 I'm Off, a 1999 novel by Jean Echenoz, also known as I'm Gone
 "I'm Gone" (George Fox song), 1998
 "I'm Gone" (Cyndi Thomson song), 2002
 "I'm Gone" (Jordan Pruitt song), 2008
 "I'm Gone" (Tyga song), 2012
 "I'm Gone", a song by Dolly Parton from Halos & Horns
 "I'm Gone" (Joyryde song), 2019
 "I'm Gone", a song by DJ Kay Slay from The Streetsweeper, Vol. 2
 "I'm Gone", a song by Jay Sean from All or Nothing